Freddy Daniel Moncur (born 8 September 1996) is an English professional footballer who plays for Ware as a midfielder.

Club career
He began his career at Buckhurst Hill, later joining West Ham United before moving to Leyton Orient. During the 2014–15 season he scored 10 goals for Orient's youth team. Earning a one-year professional contract in the summer of 2015, Moncur made his senior debut as a half-time substitute for Sean Clohessy in Orient's 2–1 Football League Trophy defeat at Luton Town on 1 September 2015.

On 7 November 2015, Moncur made his FA Cup debut, coming on as a substitute for Jack Payne in Orient's 6–1 First Round win over Staines Town.

On 29 February 2016, Moncur went on loan to Isthmian League Premier Division club Wingate & Finchley and made his debut in the League Cup tie at Kingstonian on the same day. He scored Wingate's first goal although Kingstonian won the tie on penalties.

After another successful loan spell with Wingate & Finchley between September and October 2016, Moncur joined National League South side Bishop's Stortford on a one-month loan. A day after he joined the Hertfordshire-based side, Moncur made his debut in a 1–0 away defeat against Eastbourne Borough, playing the full 90 minutes. A week later, Moncur scored his first goal for Bishop's Stortford, in a 2–1 victory over Weston-super-Mare. On 17 November 2016, Moncur's loan spell at Bishop's Stortford was extended for a further three months, but he was recalled to Orient prior to their match against Barnet on 7 January, after club captain Robbie Weir suffered a long-term injury. Moncur made his Football League debut as a second-half substitute for Sammy Moore in Orient's 4–1 defeat at Stevenage on 28 February 2017.

On 8 October 2017, Moncur returned to Bishop's Stortford on a one-month loan deal. Moncur marked his return with a goal during Bishop's Stortford 2–0 home victory over Basingstoke Town.

Moncur left Orient by mutual consent on 9 February 2018.

Five days later, Moncur returned to Wingate & Finchley for a third spell with the club, on a permanent deal.

In May 2019, Moncur joined Concord Rangers.

In July 2021 Moncur signed for Grays Athletic from Margate FC.

In June 2022, Moncur joined Bowers & Pitsea. In September 2022, Moncur joined Ware.

Personal life
He is the son of former Tottenham Hotspur, Swindon Town and West Ham United midfielder John Moncur, and the younger brother of Leyton Orient midfielder George Moncur.

He is a Christian.

Career statistics

References

External links

1996 births
Living people
English footballers
Association football midfielders
Leyton Orient F.C. players
Wingate & Finchley F.C. players
Bishop's Stortford F.C. players
Ebbsfleet United F.C. players
Concord Rangers F.C. players
National League (English football) players
Southern Football League players
Isthmian League players
East Thurrock United F.C. players
Cheshunt F.C. players
Romford F.C. players
Harlow Town F.C. players
Margate F.C. players
Grays Athletic F.C. players
Bowers & Pitsea F.C. players
Ware F.C. players
English Christians